Darreh Chah may refer to:
 Darreh Chah, Jam, Bushehr Province
 Darreh Chah, Kohgiluyeh and Boyer-Ahmad
 Darreh Chah, Lorestan